Elections to the Adur District Council were held on 7 May 1987, with one third of the council up for election. There were additional vacancies in the Churchill and Widewater wards and no elections for the two-member Marine ward. Overall turnout climbed to 48.3%.

The election resulted in the Alliance retaining control of the council.

Election result

This resulted in the following composition of the council:

Ward results

+/- figures represent changes from the last time these wards were contested.

References

1987
1987 English local elections
1980s in West Sussex